Passiflora arizonica, commonly known as the Arizona passionflower, is a species of flowering plant in the genus Passiflora. It is a perennial climbing vine. It is native to the Sonoran Desert in northwestern Mexico and southern Arizona. It has showy white-purple flowers and grows in desert grasslands.

References

arizonica